The Ventures have released over two hundred fifty   albums beginning with Walk Don't Run (1960), and over 150 singles.  The original US albums and singles are indicated by their catalog numbers and Billboard (BB) and Cashbox (CB) chart peak positions (Note: There were separate Cashbox charts for stereo and mono albums until 1965.)

Studio albums

Live albums 
 (1965) The Ventures in Japan
 (1965) The Ventures in Japan, Vol. 2
 (June 1965) The Ventures on Stage (BB #27, CB #19) - Dolton BLP 8035/BST 8035
 (1966) All About the Ventures
 (1967) The Ventures on Stage Encore
 (1968) The Ventures Live, Again!
 (1968) The Ventures in Tokyo '68
 (1970) Live! The Ventures
 (1971) Pops in Japan '71
 (1971) The Ventures on Stage '71
 (1972) The Ventures on Stage '72
 (1973) Pops in Japan '73
 (1973) The Ventures on Stage '73
 (1974) The Ventures Special '74 on Japanese Tour
 (1974) The Ventures on Stage '74
 (1975) The Ventures on Stage '75
 (1976) The Ventures on Stage '76
 (1977) Live in Japan '77
 (1978) The Ventures on Stage '78
 (1980) Super Live '80
 (1981) Live in L.A.
 (1984) Original Members: Live in Japan
 (1995) Live in Japan '65
 (1998) On Stage Encore / The Ventures Live, Again!
 (1999) Ventures in Japan/Ventures in Japan, Vol. 2
 (2001) Live in Japan 2000
 (2003) In Japan Live-2000
 (2004) In Japan, Vol. 1-2
 (2004) Pops in Japan, Vol. 1-2
 (2004) Summer & Winter: Live
 (2005) Alive Five-O Hits Live

Instructional albums 

 (1965) Play Guitar with The Ventures (BB #96) -- Dolton BLP 16501/BST 17501
 (1965) Play Guitar, Vol. 2—Dolton BLP 16502/BST 17502
 (1965) Play Guitar, Vol. 3—Dolton BLP 16503/BST 17503
 (1965) Play Guitar, Vol. 4: Play Electric Bass—Dolton BLP 16504/BST 17504
 (1967) Play Guitar, Vol. 7—Dolton BLP 16507/BST 17507

Compilation albums 
 (1963) Tarantella / Memphis
 (July 1966) Running Strong—Sunset SUM 1116/SUS 5116
 (1966) The Versatile Ventures—Liberty SCR 5
 (1967) 8 Miles High
 (September 1967) Golden Greats by The Ventures (BB #50, CB #46) -- Liberty LRP 2053/LST 8053
Reissued in 1981 on Liberty LTAO 8053
 (January 1968) The Guitar Genius of The Ventures—Sunset SUM 1160/SUS 5160
 (1967) Pops in Japan
 (1968) Pops in Japan, Vol. 2
 (October 1969) Super Group—Sunset SUS 5271
 Album cover illustration by Dean Torrence (Jan & Dean)!
 (March 1970) More Golden Greats (BB #154) -- Liberty LST 8060
 (February 1971) A Decade with the Ventures
 (November 1971) Ventures—United Artists USX-80
 (August 1973) Only Hits—United Artists UA-LA147-G
 (1974) Legendary Masters
 (January 1975) The Very Best of the Ventures
 (1975) 15th Anniversary Album: 15 Years of Japanese Pops
 (1975) The Ventures' 15th Anniversary
 (1976) Early Sounds of the Ventures
 (1977) 20 Greatest Hits
 (December 1980) Greatest Hits
 (1980) Rare Collections for Great Collectors
 (1980) The Best 10, Vol. 2
 (1980) The Ventures Greatest Hits
 (1981) The Very Best of the Ventures
 (1983) Heritage Series: Movie Themes
 (1983) Heritage Series: Spotlight
 (1983) The Ventures Today
 (1986) Best of the Ventures
 (1986) Television's Greatest Hits, Vol. 1
 (1986) The Collection
 (1987) Compact Ventures
 (1987) The Best of the Ventures
 (1988) Radical Guitars
 (1989) Christmas Classics
 (1989) Walk Don't Run: All Time Greatest Hits
 (1990) EP Collection
 (1990) Legendary Masters: Walk Don't Run - The Best of the Ventures
 (1992) Greatest Hits
 (1992) Legends of Rock 'n' Roll
 (1992) Only the Hits
 (1992) The Ventures Play Telstar - The Lonely Bull And Others / (The) Ventures In Space
 (1995) Another Smash!!! / The Colorful Ventures
 (1995) Best of the Ventures
 (1995) Guitar Freakout / Super Psychedelics
 (1995) Hollywood's Hottest Hits
 (1995) Original
 (1995) Play the Carpenters / The Jim Croce Songbook
 (1995) Play the Hits
 (1995) Surfing
 (1995) Twist with the Ventures / The Ventures' Twist Party, Vol. 2
 (1995) Ventures A Go-Go / Where the Action Is!
 (1995) Walk Don't Run, Vol. 2 / Ventures Knock Me Out!
 (1995) Walk Don't Run / Ventures
 (1996) Another Smash!!! / Ventures
 (1996) Best of Pops Sounds / Go with the Ventures
 (1996) Flights of Fantasy / The Ventures in Space
 (1996) Flights of Fantasy / Underground Fire
 (1996) Go With the Ventures! / Batman Theme
 (1996) Greatest Hits
 (1996) Hawaii Five-O / Swamp Rock
 (1996) Joy! The Ventures Play the Classics / Latin Album
 (1996) Mashed Potatoes and Gravy / Going to the Ventures Dance Party!
 (1996) Super Psychedelics / $1,000,000 Weekend
 (1996) Surfing / Colorful Ventures
 (1996) Tele-Ventures: The Ventures Perform the Great TV Themes
 (1996) Underground Fire / Hollywood Metal Dynamic Sound 3000
 (1996) Walk Don't Run / Walk, Don't Run, Vol. 2
 (1996) Where the Action Is! / The Ventures Knock Me Out!
 (1997) 36 All Time Greatest Hits
 (1997) Batman / TV Themes
 (1997) Guitar Freakout / Wild Things!
 (1997) In the Vaults
 (1997) Let's Go / Ventures Play the Country Classics
 (1997) Lonely Bull / $1,000,000 Weekend
 (1997) New Testament / More Golden Greats
 (1997) Play Guitar with the Ventures
 (1997) Play Guitar, Vol. 3 / Play Guitar, Vol. 4: Play Electric Bass
 (1997) Play Guitar, Vols. 1 & 2
 (1997) Rock and Roll Forever / Now Playing
 (1997) Swamp Rock / Hawaii Five-O
 (1997) TV Themes / Bobby Vee Meets the Ventures
 (1997) The Fabulous Ventures / The Ventures a Go-Go
 (1997) The Ventures
 (1997) Ventures on Stage / Surfing
 (1997) Wild Things! / Fabulous Ventures
 (1998) Classic 60's Themes
 (1998) EP Collection, Vol. 3
 (1998) Back to Back (7 out of 14 tracks) [w/The Shadows.]
 (1998) Horse / New Testament
 (1998) On Stage Encore / The Ventures Live, Again!
 (1998) Play Guitar, Vols. 1-4 & 7
 (1998) Stars on Guitars
 (1998) The Night Has a Thousand Eyes / Bobby Vee Meets the Ventures
 (1998) Theme from Shaft / Rocky Road
 (1999) Golden Pops / Pops in Japan '71
 (1999) In the Vaults, Vol. 2
 (1999) Rock & Roll Forever / Rocky Road
 (1999) The Ventures
 (1999) The Ventures' 10th Anniversary Album / Only Hits
 (1999) Theme From Shaft / Horse
 (1999) Ventures In Japan / Ventures In Japan, Vol. 2
 (2000) Best of the Ventures: Walk Don't Run
 (2000) Gold
 (2000) Hawaii Five-O: Remixed Hits & More
 (2000) Play Screen Themes
 (2000) Story
 (2000) Ventures Gold, Vol. 2
 (2001) Inside the Music: Surf's Up
 (2001) The Ultimate Collection
 (2001) The Ventures Play the Greatest Surfin' Hits of All Time
 (2001) Ventures Gold, Vol. 3
 (2002) Hyper Gold
 (2002) Surf Rock Anthology
 (2002) The Ventures Play the Greatest Instrumental Hits of All-Time
 (2003) All Time Greatest Hits
 (2003) Surfin' With the Ventures
 (2003) The Ventures Play the Greatest Instrumental Hits of All Time, Vol. 2
 (2003) Your Hit Parade 60's
 (2004) Best of, Vol. 1-2
 (2004) Guitar Legends
 (2004) In Japan, Vol. 1-2
 (2004) Pops a la Carte
 (2004) Pops in Japan, Vol. 1-2
 (2004) Sixties Guitar Party
 (2004) Super Deluxe
 (2004) Super Now
 (2004) Surfin' to Baja
 (2004) Walk Don't Run: Very Best Of
 (2005) 10th Anniversary Album
 (2005) In the Vaults, Vol. 3
 (2005) Platinum Collection
 (2005) Ventures
 (2007) In the Vaults, Vol. 4
 (2008) The Very Best of the Ventures (50 tracks on 2 CDs)

Video albums 
 (1966) Beloved Invaders: The Golden Era of The Ventures
 (1981) The Ventures in L.A.
 (1984) Original Members: Live in Japan
 (1989) 30 Years of Rock 'n' Roll (30th Anniversary Super Session)
 (1991) Live in Japan 1990
 (1994) Japan Tour '93
 (1995) In Concert '94
 (1996) Electrified, Amplified, and Deified
 (1998) Wild Again Concert '97
 (2004) 45th Anniversary Live

Box sets 
 (1993) Billboard Top Rock 'n' Roll Hits: 1957-1961
 (1993) Super Box of Rock, Vol. 2
 (1995) Rock Instrumental Classics, Vols. 1-5
 (1996) Cowabunga! The Surf Box
 (1997) 36 All Time Greatest Hits
 (1997) Born to Be Wild
 (1997) Play Guitar with the Ventures
 (1997) The Ultimate History of Rock 'N' Roll Collection
 (1998) 100 Jukebox Hits: 50's & 60's
 (1998) Yuletide Soiree Party Pack
 (1999) Endless Summer Legends, Vols. 1-3
 (1999) Hot Rod Box Set
 (2000) Brain in a Box: The Science Fiction Collection
 (2018) Nokie Edwards with The Ventures Live since 1999

Singles

Reissue singles
 "Walk Don't Run" / "Ram-Bunk-Shush" -- Liberty All-Time Hit Series 54518
 "Perfidia" / "Blue Moon" -- Liberty All-Time Hit Series 54519
 "Telstar" / "Out of Limits" -- Liberty All-Time Hit Series 54542
 "Wipe Out" / "Secret Agent Man" -- Liberty All-Time Hit Series 54557
 "The Lonely Bull" / "Tequila" -- Liberty All-Time Hit Series  54563
 "Hawaii Five-O" / "Classical Gas" -- Liberty All-Time Hit Series 54571
 "Walk Don't Run" / "Ram-Bunk-Shush" -- United Artists Silver Spotlight Series 050
 "Perfidia" / "Telstar" -- United Artists Silver Spotlight Series 051
 "Walk Don't Run '64" / "Hawaii Five-O" -- United Artists Silver Spotlight Series 052
 "Wipe Out" / "Nadia's Theme (The Young and The Restless)" -- United Artists Silver Spotlight Series 1161
 "Walk Don't Run" / "Hawaii Five-O" -- Collectable Record Back To Back Hit Series COL 6139

Soundtracks 
 (1986) Television's Greatest Hits, Vol. 1
 (1993) This Boy's Life
 (1996) Very Brady Sequel
 (2000) Cinemadness: Cool Songs From Hot Flicks
 (2000) Movie Madness: Cool Songs From Hot Flicks
 (2000) Tao of Steve
 (2001) 61*

Notes

References

External links

 The Ventures Home Page Discography

Rock music group discographies
Discographies of American artists